The Ministry of Agriculture, Food Security and Cooperatives was a ministry of the Government of Tanzania. Under the first Magufuli Cabinet it was merged into the Ministry of Agriculture, Livestock and Fisheries.

Mission
The three main objectives PR mission of the Ministry of Agriculture, Food Security and Cooperatives of Tanzania is as follows:

 Deliver quality agriculture and cooperative services.
 Provide conducive environments to stake holders.
 Build the capacity of local government authorities in order to facilitate and facilitate the private sector to contribute effectively for sustainable agricultural production and cooperative development.

See also
Agribusiness
Sokoine University of Agriculture

References

External links
 

A
Tanzania
Agricultural organisations based in Tanzania